Jane Austen's parents, George (1731–1805), an Anglican rector, and his wife Cassandra (1739–1827), were members of the landed gentry. George was descended from wool manufacturers who had risen to the lower ranks of the gentry, and Cassandra was a member of the Leigh family of Adlestrop and Longborough, with connections to the Leigh Baronetcy of Stoneleigh, Warwickshire.   They married on 26 April 1764 at Walcot Church in Bath. From 1765 to 1801 (for much of Jane's life), George was a rector of Anglican parishes in Steventon, Hampshire and a nearby village. Irene Collins estimates that when George Austen took up his duties as rector in 1764, Steventon comprised no more than about thirty families. From 1773 to 1796, he supplemented his income by farming and teaching three or four boys at a time (who boarded at his home).

The Austens raised a large family of six boys and two girls:
 James (1765–1819)
 George (1766–1838)
 Edward (1768–1852)
 Henry Thomas (1771–1850)
 Cassandra Elizabeth (1773–1845)
 Francis William (Frank) (1774–1865)
 Jane (1775–1817)
 Charles John (1779–1852)

Jane's sister Cassandra was an artist who, like Jane, did not marry. She was Jane's closest friend and confidante throughout her life.

James (matriculated 1779, BA 1783, MA 1788) and Henry (matriculated 1788, BA 1792, MA 1796) were both educated at St John's College, Oxford, as their father had been. Together they edited a literary magazine, The Loiterer. An accomplished poet, James was ordained as an Anglican clergyman, succeeding his father as rector of Steventon.

Of her brothers, Jane felt closest to Henry, who became a soldier, then a banker, then (after his bank failed) an Anglican clergyman. Henry was also his sister's literary agent. Henry's large circle of friends and acquaintances in London included bankers, merchants, publishers, painters and actors and he provided Jane with a view of social worlds not normally visible from a small parish in rural Hampshire. He married their first cousin (and Jane's close friend), Eliza de Feuillide, who was the daughter of their father's sister, Philadelphia Austen Hancock.

George was sent to live with a local family at a young age because, according to Austen biographer Le Faye, he was "mentally abnormal and subject to fits"; he may also have been deaf and mute.

Charles and Frank served in the navy, both rising to the rank of admiral.

Edward was adopted by his fourth cousin, Thomas Knight, inheriting Knight's estate and taking his name in 1812.

Family trees

Notes

References

Bibliography 
 Collins, Irene. Jane Austen and the Clergy. London: The Hambledon Press, 1994. .
 Fergus, Jan. "Biography". Jane Austen in Context. Ed. Janet Todd. Cambridge: Cambridge University Press, 2005. . 3–11
 Honan, Park. Jane Austen: A Life. New York: St. Martin's Press, 1987. .
 Le Faye, Deirdre. Jane Austen: A Family Record. Second Edition. Cambridge: Cambridge University Press, 2004. .
 MacDonagh, Oliver. Jane Austen: Real and Imagined Worlds. New Haven: Yale University Press, 1991. .
 Tomalin, Claire. Jane Austen: A Life. New York: Alfred A. Knopf, 1997. .
 Tucker, George Holbert. "Jane Austen's Family". The Jane Austen Companion. Ed. J. David Grey. New York: Macmillan, 1986. . 143–153

Austen